Cyrtodactylus aaroni is a species of gecko, a lizard in the family Gekkonidae. The species is  endemic to western Papua New Guinea, Indonesia.

Etymology
The specific name, aaroni, is in honor of American herpetologist Aaron M. Bauer.

Habitat

Reproduction
Cyrtodactylus aaroni is oviparous.

References

Further reading
Günther, Rainer; Rösler, Herbert (2002). "Eine neue Art der Gattung Cyrtodactylus Gray, 1827 aus dem Westen von Neuguinea (Reptilia: Sauria: Gekkonidae) ". Salamandra 38 (4): 195–212. (Cyrtodactylus aaroni, new species). (in German, with an abstract in English, and bilingual image captions).
Rösler H, Glaw F, Günther R (2005). "Aktualisierte Liste der Geckos von Neuguinea (Sauria: Gekkonidae: Gekkoninae) mit vorläufiger Charakterisierung von neun Formen aus den Gattungen Cyrtodactylus Gray, 1827, Gehyra Gray, 1834 und Nactus Kluge, 1983 ". Gekkota 5: 33–64. (in German, with an abstract in English).

aaroni
Reptiles of Western New Guinea
Endemic fauna of Indonesia
Reptiles described in 2002
Taxa named by Rainer Günther
Taxa named by Herbert Rösler (herpetologist)
Endemic fauna of New Guinea
Geckos of New Guinea